Joseph Stulac (6 March 1935 – 10 July 2001) was a Canadian basketball player. He competed in the men's tournament at the 1964 Summer Olympics.

References

1935 births
2001 deaths
Canadian men's basketball players
Olympic basketball players of Canada
Basketball players at the 1964 Summer Olympics
Basketball players from Toronto
Sportspeople from Etobicoke